Farashganj Sporting Club commonly known as Farashganj SC is an association football club based in Farashganj, Dhaka, Bangladesh. 

It is currently competing in the Bangladesh Championship League. 

Farashganj Sporting Club is situated between the historical sites Ruplal House and Northbrook Hall in the old part of Dhaka. It was also a team of Bangladesh Premier League until its relegation in the 2017–18 season.

Current squad 

Farashganj SC squad for 2021–22 season.

Head coach record

Achievements
Independence Cup
Winners (1): 2011

References

Football clubs in Bangladesh